Inter Europol Competition is a Polish motorsports team that competes in the endurance racing. The team contests the 24 Hours of Le Mans, FIA World Endurance Championship, European Le Mans Series, Asian Le Mans Series and Le Mans Cup in 2023. They formerly competed in BOSS GP, V de V and Formula Renault 2.0 Northern European Cup. As a reference to the focus of its owner and sponsor, the bakery goods producer Inter Europol S.A., the team is often referred to as "Turbo Bakers".

History

Beginnings and pre-endurance efforts

The team was founded in 2010 and grew out of a cooperation between Maurycy Kochański's Kochanski Motorsport and Michael Keese Motorsport. Their joint effort competed first in Formula Ford and Formula Three, then in 2009 in the Italian Formula Renault Championship and in 2010 in the Formula Renault 2.0 Northern European Cup. At the end of the 2010 season, Kochański ran into financial problems. His share in the team was taken over by Wojciech Śmiechowski, father of its driver Jakub Śmiechowski and owner of the Inter Europol S.A. bakery. The new team was named Inter Europol Competition after its new owner-sponsor.

Inter Europol Competition started as a single-seater team. Inter Europol's drivers competed in the Formula Renault 2.0 Northern European Cup in the 2010–2016 seasons, with team's drivers' best overall result being 12th by Jakub Śmiechowski in the 2011 season. 2014 marked the beginning of 6-years long team's effort in BOSS GP, which championship was claimed by Jakub Śmiechowski in that year. Śmiechowski also finished as the runner-up in the 2015 season.

2016 

2016 marked an important milestone for Inter Europol Competition as the team made its full European Le Mans Series and 2016 V de V Endurance Series entries, taking first steps in the endurance racing. The maiden LMP3 campaign in the ELMS with Jakub Śmiechowski and Jens Petersen driving the Ligier JS P3 brought the team 10th place overall. The effort in the V de V was more successful, as Śmiechowski paired with Martin Hippe claimed the championship of the series.

Third season of Inter Europol Competition in the BOSS GP and the first one without Jakub Śmiechowski behind the wheel brought 8th place for the Dane Jens Renstrup, who drove a Dallara GP2/05.

2017 

In their second year in the endurance racing Inter Europol Competition continued their effort in the European Le Mans Series, bringing to the field a single LMP3 car, Ligier JS P3 number 13. Jens Petersen has been replaced by Martin Hippe, who became team's regular ELMS driver in the years to come. After scoring their maiden podium in the 4 Hours of Castellet, the team achieved a fifth-place finish in the general LMP3 standings.

The team entered the V de V Endurance Series as well, claiming the championship with a car number 22 with Jakub Śmiechowski and Hendrik Still behind the wheel. The best of the car number 33 drivers, Paul Scheuschner, finished eighth.

Walter Steding, driving a Dallara GP2/05 for Inter Europol Competition in his first season, claimed 8th position in the overall classification of the BOSS GP.

2018 

In 2018 Inter Europol Competition once again entered the LMP3 class of the European Le Mans Series, this time with two Ligier JS P3 cars. 2018 was a breakthrough for a car number 13, as Martin Hippe and Jakub Śmiechowski scored a race win in 4 Hours of Portimão and a third place in 4 Hours of Red Bull Ring – two podiums in total - to finish runners-up in the championship standings. A new entry from the team, car number 14, hosted a total of six drivers in six races, resulting in 15th place in the final LMP3 classification.

2018 marked the final run of Inter Europol Competition in the V de V Endurance series. Paul Scheuschner, driving a car number 33, finished 3rd in the general standings, while the pair of Jakub Śmiechowski and Pontus Fredriksson in a car number 22 claimed 5th overall.

The team was represented in BOSS GP again by Walter Seding behind the wheel of Dallara GP2/05. Steding finished fourth overall.

2019 

The new season saw Inter Europol Competition branching out into new territory of Asian Le Mans Series with Martin Hippe and Jakub Śmiechowski behind the wheel of a number 13 Ligier JS P3 car. The campaign proved to be successful for the team, which claimed the overall victory and an invitation for the 2019 24 Hours of Le Mans race.

In the European Le Mans Series the team stepped up to the LMP2 class after purchasing a Ligier JS P217 in addition to fielding two LMP3 Ligier JS P3 cars for the second consecutive year. The LMP2 campaign didn't bring good results and after frequent lineup changes Inter Europol Competition claimed 17th place in the overall classification.
The effort of Martin Hippe pairing up with Nigel Moore, who replaced Jakub Śmiechowski behind the wheel of a car number 13 in the LMP3 class, turned out to be much more fruitful with the team claiming the back-to-back 2nd place overall after a penalty in the last race of the season and rejection of the team's appeal. Car number 14 finished 12th overall.

In June Inter Europol Competition made their debut in the 24 Hours of Le Mans race. Jakub Śmiechowski, Nigel Moore and James Winslow, driving a Ligier JS P217, recorded 45th in the race overall standings and 16th in the LMP2 class standings, after having dealt with a lot of technical issues.

In team's last season in BOSS GP the only full-season driver Walter Steding took 9th place in the general standings.

2020 

Inter Europol Competition again started the year with Asian Le Mans Series bid, claiming 4th with car 33 and 5th with car 34 in the LMP2 standings. The cars were driven by John Corbett, Nathan Kumar, Mitchell Neilson and Danial Frost, as well as Mathias Beche, Jakub Śmiechowski and James Winslow respectively. The team ran also one full season entry in the LMP3 class with car 13, raced by Martin Hippe and Nigel Moore, who finished 3rd overall, and two part season entries with cars 14 and 18.

Inter Europol Competition contested the shortened European Le Mans Series season as well, with one entry in LMP2 and LMP3 classes. LMP2 34 car, the only Ligier on the grid, saw a major lineup overhaul with Rene Binder and Matevos Isaakyan joining Jakub Śmiechowski for the ELMS and Le Mans effort. For its LMP3 bid, the team retained the duo of Martin Hippe and Nigel Moore. The LMP2 crew finished the season 12th overall, while Hippe, Moore and Dino Lunardi, who replaced Moore for last two races of the season, claimed the third consecutive ELMS LMP3 vice champion title for the Inter Europol Competition.

The team appeared on the grid of the 24 Hours of Le Mans race for the second time, struggling with technical and regulatory issues, finishing 17th in class and 45th overall.

Inter Europol Competition wrapped the 2020 season up with two races of the IMSA SportsCar Championship, in which the team used the Oreca 07 prototype for the first time. They finished 3rd in LMP2 class and 9th overall in the Petit Le Mans. 12 Hours of Sebring proved to be a more difficult challenge; after Śmiechowski's spin in the 4th hour of the race and subsequent repairs car 51 finished 4th in class and 17th overall.

2021 

With a single Oreca 07 the team contested the LMP2 class of World Endurance Championship, moving up there from European Le Mans Series. Car 34 was driven by Jakub Śmiechowski, Renger van der Zande and Alex Brundle. Hélio Castroneves was to drive for the team in 1000 Miles of Sebring as a substitute for van der Zande due to Dutchman's IMSA SportsCar Championship commitments, but the race has been cancelled. Louis Delétraz replaced van der Zande in the race at Portimão.

In their first races in WEC, the "Turbo Bakers" have been in the broad front of the pack and have steadily improved their results, placing 5th in the 6 Hours of Spa and 8 Hours of Portimão, as well as 4th in the 6 Hours of Monza.

The team's third participation in the 24 Hours of Le Mans was the most successful race to date - the team finished 5th in the LMP2 class and 10th overall. Śmiechowski, Brundle and van der Zande, driving a car number 34, showed a good pace and avoided major mistakes and bad luck - with the exceptions of a puncture in Brundle's car, an unfaulted collision with the Racing Team India Eurasia car and problems with the refuelling machine. The team's drivers expressed their great satisfaction with the weekend at Circuit de la Sarthe, describing it as "an amazing result for such a small team" and claiming that "this brilliant team have a huge future."

The team finished the two WEC season-ending races at Bahrain in ninth (after incidents such as a collision with a United Autosports car, having to make an extra stop due to a door failure, and a 4-minute penalty for a tire allocation infringement) and fifth, allowing Inter Europol Competition to finish its debut season in the World Endurance Championship in 5th place.

The other part of Inter Europol Competition racing programme for 2021 was LMP3 class of European Le Mans Series, in which the team took part running two Ligier JS P320 machineries. Prototype number 13, as in the 2018 and 2019 seasons, recorded better results than its sister crew, scoring three podiums in total, including one win - thanks to the efforts of German Martin Hippe, who has been driving for the team since the 2016 season, young Belgian Ugo de Wilde and their changing partners. This was enough to finish fourth overall, the weakest result since the 2018 season - primarily due to crashes and car's failures at Le Castellet and Spa-Francorchamps.
Crew number 14 recorded results in the middle of the ELMS stakes, finishing 6th overall - the best result ever for the #14. A total of nine drivers drove a second Ligier, including a former Italian motorcycle road racer Mattia Pasini and a Pole Mateusz Kaprzyk.

2022 

Inter Europol Competition began their season with a single LMP3 entry in the Asian Le Mans Series, finishing 7th despite showing a race-winning pace - after a sudden and forced change to the driver line-up, technical problems and drivers' mistakes.

For the 2022 season the team expanded their programme, which included two LMP2 entries in total - one in the World Endurance Championship and the other in the European Le Mans Series, as well as two LMP3 cars in the ELMS. The WEC project continued with Alex Brundle, who has renewed contract with the team, and Jakub Śmiechowski, who once again acted as a driver and team principal. Van der Zande, busy with Cadillac LMDh development, has been replaced by a Mexican former Formula 1 driver Esteban Gutiérrez.

The ELMS LMP2 car was driven by a Formula 1 test driver Pietro Fittipaldi, returning to endurance racing after a 2-year hiatus David Heinemeier Hansson and a Swiss Fabio Scherer. LMP3 Ligier number 13 saw Charles Crews, Guilherme de Oliveira and Nico Pino behind the wheel, while Noam Abramczyk, James Dayson and Mateusz Kaprzyk drove the #14.

The first part of the season was extremely difficult for the team. In every race Inter Europol Competition was struggling with all kinds of problems - from drivers' mistakes, to technical problems, to the car not complying with the regulations. As a result, after the first two races the team was at the end of WEC and ELMS general classifications. The main reasons for the team's poor performance were the sudden departure of Rafał Pokora - team's technical director, the need to restructure the team and significant turnover among the staff.

Both LMP2 cars took part in the 2022 24 Hours of Le Mans and crossed the finish line in 13th (number 34) and 14th (number 43) place in class. The WEC car struggled with maximum speed, which was partially resolved by the engine change hours before the race, and other lesser issues. Car number 43 (loaned from the DragonSpeed team, as Oreca due to worldwide supply chain issues wasn't able to deliver the purchased car on time) has been climbing up the ranks up till early morning, when the ignition coil failure forced Heinemeier Hansson to come to the pits for repairs, which eliminated the crew from the podium contention.

The second part of the season went more successfully for the team. The WEC season was completed by Brundle, Gutierrez and Śmiechowski in 11th place. The team showed itself from a particularly good side at Monza, taking 4th place there, even holding on to the lead less than an hour before the finish. The ELMS also saw significant progress, with the #43 crew placing 2nd at Spa-Francorchamps after starting from the bottom of the pile, and 4th in the season finale at Portimao, finishing the year in 8th place.

In the LMP3 class, Inter Europol Competition recorded its fourth runner-up finish in the past five years. After three wins in a row at Monza, Circuit de Catalunya and Spa-Francorchamps, the championship was lost an hour before the finish of the 4 Hours of Portimao - as a result of a collision between Nico Pino and Mathias Beche and the resulting suspension damage. The damage, originally resulting in a significant pace drop, soon proved to be terminal and eliminated the car from the race 12 minutes before the end of the season. Car No. 14, meanwhile, finished last, 13th overall, mainly as a result of slow runs and numerous mistakes by James Dayson.

The last part of the team's 2022 effort was a guest start in the new Prototype Cup Germany series - with a single LMP3 car, driven by James Winslow,  returning to the team, and Damian Ciosek. They have finished 6th and 2nd during the weekend at Spa-Francorchamps.

2023 

The team contests the 24 Hours of Le Mans, FIA World Endurance Championship, European Le Mans Series, Asian Le Mans Series and Le Mans Cup in 2023 with respectively two, one, two, four and three entries.

The season started with four car effort in Asian Le Mans Series. LMP2 car was very quick throghout the whole season, with blistering pace of Nolan Siegel being one of the most important factors. However, two mechanical failures in last minutes of the first and last races, with Siegel respectively in P3 and P1, stripped the team from the championship. LMP3 crews finished 7th, 12th and 15th (last) in the general standings.

Further plans – Hypercar 

The future target for the team is to purchase an LMDh prototype to compete in the Hypercar class of endurance racing.

Racing record

24 Hours of Le Mans

FIA World Endurance Championship

European Le Mans Series 
{| class="wikitable" style="font-size: 90%; text-align:center"
!Year
!Class
!No
!Chassis
!Engine
!Drivers
!1
!2
!3
!4
!5
!6
!
!Pts
|-
|2016
|LMP3
| 13
|Ligier JS P3
|Nissan VK50VE 5.0 L V8
| align="left" | Jens Petersen (all rounds) Jakub Śmiechowski (all rounds)
| style="background:#efcfff;" |SIL
| style="background:#DFFFDF;" |IMO
| style="background:#efcffF;" |RBR
| style="background:#DFFFDF;" |LEC
| style="background:#DFFFDF;" |SPA
| style="background:#DFFFDF;" |EST
|10th
|24.5
|-
|2017
|LMP3
| 13
|Ligier JS P3
|Nissan VK50VE 5.0 L V8
| align="left" | Martin Hippe (all rounds) Jakub Śmiechowski (all rounds)
| style="background:#DFFFDF;" |SIL
| style="background:#DFFFDF;" |MON
| style="background:#DFFFDF;" |RBR
| style="background:#DFDFDF;" |LEC
| style="background:#DFFFDF;" |SPA
| style="background:#efcfff;" |POR
|5th
|56
|-
| rowspan="2" |2018
| rowspan="2" |LMP3
| 13
|Ligier JS P3
|Nissan VK50VE 5.0 L V8
| align="left" | Martin Hippe (all rounds) Jakub Śmiechowski (all rounds)
| style="background:#DFFFDF;" |LEC
| style="background:#DFFFDF;" |MON
| style="background:#FFDF9F;" |RBR
| style="background:#DFFFDF;" |SIL
| style="background:#DFFFDF;" |SPA
| style="background:#FFFFBF;" |POR
| style="background:#DFDFDF;" |2nd
|70.25
|-
|14
|Ligier JS P3
|Nissan VK50VE 5.0 L V8
| align="left" | Paul Scheuschner (all rounds) Luca Demarchi (rounds 1–5) Henning Enqvist (round 1) Hendrik Still (rounds 2, 4) Guglielmo Belotti (round 3) Moritz Müller-Crepon (rounds 5–6)
| style="background:#DFFFDF;" |LEC
| style="background:#DFFFDF;" |MON
| style="background:#DFFFDF;" |RBR
| style="background:#DFFFDF;" |SIL
| style="background:#DFFFDF;" |SPA
| style="background:#DFFFDF;" |POR
|15th
|6.25
|-
| rowspan="3" |2019
|LMP2
|34
|Ligier JS P217
|Gibson GK428 4.2 L V8
| align="left" | Jakub Śmiechowski (all rounds) Dani Clos (rounds 1–3)  Léo Roussel (rounds 1–2) Adrien Tambay (rounds 3–4) Lukas Dunner (round 4) Sam Dejonghe (rounds 5–6) Mathias Beche (rounds 5–6)
| style="background:#DFFFDF;" |LEC
| style="background:#DFFFDF;" |MON
| style="background:#efcfff;" |CAT
| style="background:#DFFFDF;" |SIL
| style="background:#DFFFDF;" |SPA
| style="background:#efcfff;" |POR
|17th
|2
|-
| rowspan="2" |LMP3
|13
|Ligier JS P3
|Nissan VK50VE 5.0 L V8
| align="left" | Martin Hippe (all rounds) Nigel Moore (all rounds)
| style="background:#FFDF9F;" |LEC
| style="background:#DFDFDF;" |MON
| style="background:#FFFFBF;" |CAT
| style="background:#DFDFDF;" |SIL
| style="background:#DFDFDF;" |SPA
| style="background:#DFFFDF;" |POR
| style="background:#DFDFDF;" |2nd
|94.5
|-
|14
|Ligier JS P3
|Nissan VK50VE 5.0 L V8
| align="left" | Paul Scheuschner (all rounds) Dino Lunardi (round 1) Sam Dejonghe (rounds 2–4) Constantin Schöll (rounds 5–6)
| style="background:#DFFFDF;" |LEC
| style="background:#DFFFDF;" |MON
| style="background:#efcfff;" |CAT
| style="background:#efcfff;" |SIL
| style="background:#DFFFDF;" |SPA
| style="background:#DFFFDF;" |POR
|12th
|16.5
|-
| rowspan="2" |2020
|LMP2
|34
|Ligier JS P217
|Gibson GK428 4.2 L V8
| align="left" | Jakub Śmiechowski (all rounds) Rene Binder (all rounds) Matevos Isaakyan (rounds 1–4)
| style="background:#DFFFDF;" |LEC
| style="background:#DFFFDF;" |SPA
| style="background:#DFFFDF;" |LEC
| style="background:#DFFFDF;" |MON
| style="background:#efcfff;" |POR
| --
|12th
|15.5
|-
|LMP3
|13
|Ligier JS P320
|Nissan VK56VE 5.6 L V8
| align="left" | Martin Hippe (all rounds) Nigel Moore (rounds 1–3) Dino Lunardi (rounds 4–5)
| style="background:#DFDFDF;" |LEC
| style="background:#efcfff;" |SPA
| style="background:#FFDF9F;" |LEC
| style="background:#FFFFBF;" |MON
| style="background:#FFDF9F;" |POR
| --
| style="background:#DFDFDF;" |2nd
|73
|-
| rowspan="2" |2021
| rowspan="2" |LMP3
|13
|Ligier JS P320
|Nissan VK56VE 5.6 L V8
| align="left" | Martin Hippe (all rounds) Ugo de Wilde (all rounds) Julien Falchero (round 1) Ulysse de Pauw (rounds 2–3) Mattia Pasini (round 4) Aidan Read (round 5)  Adam Eteki (round 6)
| style="background:#FFDF9F;" |CAT
| style="background:#DFFFDF;" |RBR
| style="background:#efcfff;" |LEC
| style="background:#FFDF9F;" |MON
| style="background:#efcfff;" |SPA
| style="background:#FFFFBF;" |POR
| 4th
| 67
|-
|14
|Ligier JS P320
|Nissan VK56VE 5.6 L V8
| align="left" | Julius Adomavičius (rounds 1, 3) Alessandro Bracalente (round 1) Mattia Pasini (rounds 1–3, 5) Gustas Grinbergas (round 2) Mateusz Kaprzyk (rounds 2–6) Erwin Creed (round 4) Marius Zug (round 4) Nico Pino (rounds 5–6) Patryk Krupiński (round 6)
| style="background:#DFFFDF;" |CAT
| style="background:#DFFFDF;" |RBR
| style="background:#DFFFDF;" |LEC
| style="background:#DFFFDF;" |MON
| style="background:#efcfff;" |SPA
| style="background:#DFFFDF;" |POR
| 6th
| 36
|-
| rowspan="3" |2022
|LMP2
|43
|Oreca 07
|Gibson GK428 4.2 L V8
| align="left" |  Pietro Fittipaldi (all rounds) David Heinemeier Hansson (all rounds) Fabio Scherer (all rounds)
| style="background:#cfcfff;"| LEC
| style="background:#DFFFDF;"| IMO
| style="background:#cfcfff;"| MON
| style="background:#cfcfff;"| CAT
| style="background:#DFDFDF;"| SPA
| style="background:#DFFFDF;"| POR
| 8th 
| 32 
|-
| rowspan="2" |LMP3
|13
|Ligier JS P320
|Nissan VK56VE 5.6 L V8
| align="left" | Charles Crews (all rounds) Guilherme Oliveira (all rounds)  Nico Pino (all rounds) 
| | LEC
| style="background:#DFFFDF;"| IMO
| style="background:#FFFFBF;"| MON
| style="background:#FFFFBF;"| CAT
| style="background:#FFFFBF;"| SPA
| style="background:#efcfff;"| POR
| style="background:#DFDFDF;"| 2nd
| 79
|-
|14
|Ligier JS P320
|Nissan VK56VE 5.6 L V8
| align="left" | Noam Abramczyk (all rounds) James Dayson (all rounds) Mateusz Kaprzyk (all rounds) 
| style="background:#DFFFDF;" | LEC
| style="background:#efcfff;" | IMO
| style="background:#efcfff;" | MON
| style="background:#DFFFDF;" | CAT
| style="background:#DFFFDF;" | SPA
| style="background:#DFFFDF;" | POR
| 13th
| 13
|-
| rowspan="2" |2023
|LMP2
|43
|Oreca 07
|Gibson GK428 4.2 L V8
| align="left" |TBATBATBA
|CAT
|IMO
|LEC
|ARA
|SPA
|POR
|
|
|-
|LMP3
|13
|Ligier JS P320
|Nissan VK56VE 5.6 L V8
| align="left" | Sebastián Álvarez  Kai Askey Miguel Cristóvão
|CAT
|IMO
|LEC
|ARA
|SPA
|POR
|
|
|}

Asian Le Mans Series

Le Mans Cup

IMSA SportsCar Championship

References 

Auto racing teams established in 2010
2010 establishments in Poland
24 Hours of Le Mans teams
FIA World Endurance Championship teams
European Le Mans Series teams
WeatherTech SportsCar Championship teams
Formula Renault Eurocup teams